The Communist Youth Union of Spain (UJCE; also simply the Communist Youth) is the youth organisation of the Communist Party of Spain (PCE).

The UJCE merged with the Federation of the Socialist Youth of Spain (FJS) to form the Juventudes Socialistas Unificadas (JSU) in 1936, following the policy lines friendly to the concept of popular front established in the 7th World Congress of the Comintern.

It was formally reconstituted under the UJCE name in 1961.

As the PCE, the UJCE is a founding member of United Left.

UJCE is a member of the World Federation of Democratic Youth.

References

External links 
 Official Website
 Web on the history of UJCE

Communist Party of Spain
United Left (Spain)
Youth wings of communist parties
Youth wings of political parties in Spain